Last Ninja 3 is an action-adventure video game that was developed and published by System 3 for the Commodore 64, Amiga, Atari ST in 1991. It is a sequel to the 1988 game Last Ninja 2.

Development and release
The Amiga and Atari ST versions of Last Ninja 3, as developed by System 3, began development in September 1990, and were released in the March 1991 for the Amiga and Atari ST; a DOS version was in development and announced for the same month, but was never released. Adrian Cale, the co-director of Last Ninja 3, stated that the game was conceived because "the Ninja games have almost become a genre in their own right. People buy them because they specifically want that type of game. ... years ago Last Ninja was state of the art on 8-bit machines, we're now trying to make it state of the art on 16-bit". Unlike its predecessors, Last Ninja 3 may have more than one enemy on-screen at once. Alongside this, the enemy AI was improved: Stan Schembri, a designer for Last Ninja 3, said that they are "a lot more intelligent", further stating that "they attempt to react to the way you move. In Ninja 2 if you were fighting that was it. In this one if you make a slight move, an enemy will try to come round to fight you from the back". Last Ninja 3 was designed with arcade-style gameplay in mind: this manifests in the form of changes to Ninja 3's combat, and the addition of bosses. Due to these gameplay changes, the game's joystick controls are also altered: while previous Last Ninja games have controls for turning and moving separately, the protagonist now faces and moves in the same direction the stick is pushed.

Last Ninja 3's graphics were intentionally made aesthetically different from previous games in the series. Cale said that some of the game's enemies are "more fantasy oriented", as opposed to "a load of guys in karate gear". Cale further expressed that the Last Ninja 3 team "tried to create character animation that hasn't been seen in other games", with making the animations 'realistic' being a priority. The One expressed that the development team also prioritized walkcycle animations, with the graphic artists seeking to avoid characters 'looking like they're skating'. Last Ninja 3 has larger sprites than its predecessors: the protagonist's sprite is double the size of that of previous games. The 16-bit versions of Last Ninja 3 were programmed by Mark Dawson and Dave Collins from the game studio Eldritch the Cat. Despite the size of Last Ninja 3's sprites, they don't use much processor time: the game's 3D masking uses more processing power, with about 200 layers of masking per screen. According to Collins & Dawson, the game's 3D masking was one of the hardest aspects to code. The Amiga version was the first version of the game made, and was used as the basis for the Atari ST and cancelled DOS conversions. Dawson primarily programmed the Atari ST version, which he expressed is easier than the DOS version due to the ST 'essentially using the same code', while Collins worked on the DOS version. Rather than using a PC running PDS for development like previous System 3 games, Last Ninja 3 was programmed on Intel 80386 PCs with SNASM boards. Collins & Dawson expressed that the 386 PCs & SNASM boards eased Last Ninja 3's development, and stated that they "mak[e] life far easier. You can look through memory on your PC and all sorts of things easily".

In a retrospective interview in 2005, System 3's Mark Cale felt that the game was "by no means the best entry in the series", blaming the breakup of the original Last Ninja series team, stating that "when working with such talented people as John Twiddy and Hugh Riley, there was always a certain amount of magic and things just flowed. With some other developers, they were always trying to escape the nemesis of the past. I think the programmers on Ninja 3 were always trying to outdo John Twiddy, rather than make a great game. It wasn’t as good as it should have been".

Last Ninja 3 was re-released on the Virtual Console in North America in 2008, and in 2010 in Europe. Last Ninja 3 was pulled from the European Virtual Console storefront in 2010 due to a bug in the game which resulted in the game freezing after the first level, which was present since its release in 2008.

Reception

According to Mark Cale, about 3 million copies of the game were sold. The game was very well received by the press. The Amiga version reviews included the review scores of 81% from Amiga Format, 80% Amiga Power, and 90% from CU Amiga. The C64 version was further acclaimed, including the scores of 94% from Computer + Video Games and 93% from Zzap!.

British gaming magazine The One gave the Amiga version of Last Ninja 3 an overall score of 90%, and noted the game as incorporating console and arcade-style gameplay elements. The One praised Last Ninja 3's new weapons & moves, and favorably expressed that they don't 'dilute the game's challenge', further remarking that these elements "bring it to another level of playability". The One praised Last Ninja 3's "complex" and "creative" puzzles and map design, and "detailed" larger sprites, further noting the game as having 'good visual details' and effects, such as motion blur for weapons being swung. The One noted the game as 'unoriginal' and somewhat 'dated' due to advents in the graphic adventure genre, but expressed that the game is fun, challenging, and "a classic".

References

External links
 Last Ninja Archives
 Last Ninja 3 at Hall of Light Amiga database
 
 
 Images of Last Ninja 3 box and manual at C64Sets.com

Cancelled ZX Spectrum games
1991 video games
Action-adventure games
Amiga games
Atari ST games
Cancelled DOS games
Commodore 64 games
Amiga CD32 games
Video games about ninja
Virtual Console games
Video games with isometric graphics
Video games developed in the United Kingdom